Irineu Roque Scherer (15 December 1950 – 2 July 2016) was a Roman Catholic bishop.

Ordained to the priesthood in 1978. Scherer served as bishop of the Roman Catholic Diocese of Garanhuns, Brazil, from 1998 to 2007. He then served as bishop of the Roman Catholic Diocese of Joinville from 2007 until his death.

Notes

1950 births
2016 deaths
20th-century Roman Catholic bishops in Brazil
21st-century Roman Catholic bishops in Brazil
Roman Catholic bishops of Garanhuns
Roman Catholic bishops of Joinville